Suzanne Lena Prentice  (born 19 September 1958 in Invercargill) is a New Zealand politician and country singer. Her most successful single "When I Dream" peaked at number 11 in New Zealand during 1982.

In the 1995 Queen's Birthday Honours, Prentice was appointed an Officer of the Order of the British Empire, for services to music.

She stood as a candidate for the 2010 mayoral elections in Invercargill but was unsuccessful.

In 2016 she was presented with the Benny Award from the Variety Artists Club of New Zealand, the highest honour for a New Zealand entertainer.

Discography

Charting albums

Awards and honours

Country Music Awards (CMAA)
Suzanne Prentice has won three Golden guitar awards and was inducted into the Roll of Renown at the Tamworth Country Music Awards of Australia

|-
| 1974 || Suzanne Prentice Dust On Mother's Bible|| Female Vocalist of the Year || 
|-
| 1977 || Suzanne Prentice Sweet Country Music|| Female Vocalist of the Year || 
|-
| 1978 || Suzanne Prentice How Great Thou Art|| Female Vocalist of the Year || 
|-
| 1983 || Suzanne Prentice One Day At a Time|| Top Selling|| 
|-

Officer of the Order of the British Empire

|-
|1995
|herself
|Officer of the Order of the British Empire (OBE) "for services to music"
|
|-

See also
Music of New Zealand
2010 New Zealand local elections

References

Living people
New Zealand country singers
People from Invercargill
1958 births
New Zealand Officers of the Order of the British Empire
20th-century New Zealand  women  singers
Invercargill Licensing Trust Board members